The 2016 United States House of Representatives elections in Hawaii occurred on November 8, 2016. The electorate chose two candidates to act in the U.S. House, one from each of the state's two districts. Hawaii is one of 14 states that employ an open primary system, meaning voters do not have to state a party affiliation in the election. The primaries were held on August 13.

Overview
Results of the 2016 United States House of Representatives elections in Hawaii by district:

District 1

The 1st district is located entirely on the island of Oahu, encompassing the urban areas of the City and County of Honolulu, a consolidated city-county that includes Oahu's central plains and southern shores, including the towns of Aiea, Mililani, Pearl City, Waipahu and Waimalu. It is the only majority-Asian district in the United States. The district was vacant leading into the election. It was represented by Democrat Mark Takai from 2015 until his death in July 2016. He was elected with 51% of the vote in 2014 and the district has a PVI of D+18.

Democratic primary

Republican primary

Libertarian primary

Nonpartisan primary

General election

Results

District 2

The 2nd district encompasses the rest of the island of Oahu, including the Windward, North Shore, Central and Leeward regions, as well as the entire state outside of Oahu. This includes the areas located in the counties of Kauai (which includes the islands of Kauai, Niihau, Lehua and Kaula), Maui (which consists of the islands of Maui, Kahoolawe, Lānai, Molokai except for a portion of Molokai that comprises Kalawao County and Molokini) and Hawaii County coextensive with the Island of Hawaii, often called "the Big Island". The incumbent is Democrat Tulsi Gabbard, who has represented the district since 2013. She was elected with 79% of the vote in 2014 and the district has a PVI of D+21.

Democratic primary

Republican primary

Nonpartisan primary

General election

Results

See also

 2016 United States House of Representatives elections
 2016 United States Senate election in Hawaii

References

External links
 Office of Elections, Hawaii

United States House of Representatives
Hawaii
2016